"I Will Follow You into the Dark" is a song by American indie rock band Death Cab for Cutie, the third single from their fifth album, Plans, released on August 30, 2005.

Written and performed by Ben Gibbard, it is an acoustic solo ballad, and was recorded in monaural with a single microphone and little editing.

The single was released on Atlantic Records, becoming one of Death Cab for Cutie's lowest-charting singles, peaking number 28 on the Modern Rock Tracks, number 66 on the UK Singles Chart and failing to chart on the Billboard Hot 100; however, "I Will Follow You into the Dark" was certified as double platinum by the Recording Industry Association of America, and is the band's best-selling single to-date. Despite charting lower than other singles, the single is still one of the band's most played songs on commercial radio stations. The song's popularity has led it to be featured in a various television shows and movies, and has been covered by numerous artists.

Background
The song was written entirely by Death Cab for Cutie's lead singer and guitarist Ben Gibbard.

Nearing age 29, Gibbard had never lost anyone really special in his life. Growing older during an ideal and comfortable time of his life led him to begin obsessing over death, the afterlife, and the weight of his relationships. He started to take stock of the importance of the people in his life and felt a need to say something about it, writing the song to deal with his problems of focusing on life by expanding his scope to include death and what comes afterward.

Recording
Originally planned to be recorded later in the sessions for Plans, technical issues arose with one set of headphones while tracking the vocals for a different song. Producer and guitarist Chris Walla told Gibbard to take a break while the issues were being addressed. Gibbard picked up his guitar and began playing "I Will Follow You into the Dark", which was still going through the vocal microphone. Walla was impressed by the sound, leading him to suggest they do a quick tracking of the performance. It was this mono recording, with the only editing being mild compression and de-essing, that was eventually featured on the album and released as a single. Due to the impromptu nature of the recording, the vocals on the track are mixed louder than the guitar, and Gibbard's breathing can be heard at the start of the song.

Music videos

The music video, filmed in Romania and directed by Jamie Thraves, features Ben Gibbard in a small sparsely decorated apartment, playing the song while sitting on his bed.

Release
"I Will Follow You into the Dark" has two separate United Kingdom-exclusive, colored vinyl 7" releases with B-sides recorded as part of the band's Rolling Stone originals session. The part-one release is printed on teal vinyl with "Photobooth" from The Forbidden Love EP as the B-side, and the part-two release is printed on clear orange vinyl with a B-side of "Brothers on a Hotel Bed". The CD single was also only released in the UK and contains the same "Brothers on a Hotel Bed" B-side.

Reception

Critical reception
Critical response to "I Will Follow You into the Dark" was generally positive. In their reviews for the album Plans, Robert Christgau selected the song as his "choice cut", Pitchfork Media called it the album's "quiet centerpiece" and praised its "unexpected turns of phrase", PopMatters called it "one of the best written pop songs of the year – if not of the past five years", and Tiny Mix Tapes stated that it was "one of the band's best songs to date." Rolling Stone however, said that the song "demonstrates how wise Gibbard is to let the band mess with his pristine melodies, which would sound wispy and ignorable on their own."

The song was nominated for the 2007 Grammy Award for Best Pop Performance by a Duo or Group with Vocals, but lost to "My Humps" by the Black Eyed Peas. By being nominated in this category, instead of for Best Male Pop Vocal Performance, it credited the entire band for Gibbard's solo performance.

Commercial reception
The song achieved gold certification from the Recording Industry Association of America in December 2009, for over 500,000 sales. "I Will Follow You into the Dark" became Death Cab for Cutie's best-selling single to date, and their overall second best-selling release after the album Plans itself.

Usage in the media 
"I Will Follow You into the Dark" was featured on the soundtrack of the 2007 film The Invisible, a remake of the 2002 Swedish film Den Osynlige. In 2008 it was featured in the television series 90210, in the episode "That Which We Destroy". The song was featured in the sitcom Scrubs, in the season eight episode entitled "My Last Words", first broadcast in January 2009. The same year it was also the title of an episode of Grey's Anatomy in the fifth season, originally airing in March 2009. It was used in the 2011 Nikita episode "Into the Dark" (of which it was also the namesake), and was also used in the film Friends With Benefits the same year. An instrumental version of the song was featured in the 2011 film Crazy, Stupid, Love. The song was also used for the end credits of Mike Birbiglia's Netflix comedy special My Girlfriend's Boyfriend.

The 2012 film Into the Dark, originally titled I Will Follow You Into the Dark, derives its name from the song.

The book series, "ghostgirl", references the song in the books.

A parody of the song, entitled "I Will Follow You into the Abyss of Death", is featured in the 2007 film Alvin and the Chipmunks.  In the movie, protagonist Dave Seville (Jason Lee) pitches the tune to record company executive Ian Hawke (David Cross), who pans it after hearing only a few seconds, and then encourages Seville to abandon his songwriting career.

Episode 6 of Season 3 of After Life (TV series) by Ricky Gervais featured the song.

Episode 7 of Season 1 of Tell Me Lies (TV series) featured the song.

Charts

Certifications

Cover versions
Amanda Palmer of The Dresden Dolls recorded a cover of the song during the recording sessions for Who Killed Amanda Palmer. It appears on the limited edition 'Alternate Tracks' release as well as a Brainwashed Records compilation entitled 'Peace (for mom)'.  She also performed the song at a concert held in Vancouver, British Columbia, Canada on a tour in November 2011 for what would become the album An Evening With Neil Gaiman & Amanda Palmer, in tribute to the overdose death of a young woman at Occupy Vancouver two days earlier.
Canadian singer Amy Millan recorded a cover of the song.  An audio sample can be heard on her official MySpace page.
Bluegrass band Cadillac Sky recorded a cover of the song and is included on the band's self-produced EP/CD, Weary Angel.
Andrew Belle recorded a cover of the song on his Sundays at Rockit album.
Stewart Francke released a cover of the song on the album Heartless World, which he made available for free download on his website after the death of Clarence Clemons, along with the song "Summer Soldier (Holler If Ya Hear Me)" featuring Bruce Springsteen.
Everclear covered this song on their Return to Santa Monica album.
Bayside covered this song on the limited-edition EP, Bayside/I Am the Avalanche.
American singer-songwriter Matt Simons covered the song in his debut album Pieces and is the only cover song on the album with the other 9 tracks all Simons' compositions.
California singer-songwriter-guitarist Julianna Zachariou covered the song on her 2011 debut album Tell Tell Tell.  It is the only cover song on the album; the other 11 tracks are originals.
Caroline Glaser, The Voice USA 2013 Alumni, recorded a cover of the song on her 2013 EP called Caroline Glaser, Vol. 1. It is one of the only 3 songs on her first EP; the other 2 tracks are originals.
 Daniela Andrade, a Honduran-Canadian singer/songwriter, recorded the song for her 2013 album of acoustic covers, Covers, Vol. 1.
 Natalie Imbruglia covered the song on her album Male released in 2015.
 Ingrid Michaelson and Mat Kearney covered the song live in their 2010 tour.
 Amy Lee of the band Evanescence covered the song on a Hello Kitty keyboard for online magazine Loudwire.
 Dave Crosby, most famously known for his songs on YouTube with his daughter, sang this during the Blind Auditions of The Voice Season 13
 Indie pop band Echosmith performed a live cover of the song as part of their setlist for their 2018 Inside A Dream tour.
 This Wild Life performed a shortened (1 verse and 1 chorus) version of the song as part of their Warped Tour 2018 set.
 Yungblud and Halsey produced a duo version for Triple J's Like a Version radio shop with an accompanying video released 21, Feb 2019.
 Anthony Raneri recorded this song on the album "Friends" which is a "Various artists" album.
 Miya Folick recorded an her own version of "I Will Follow You Into The Dark", that was used in episode 6 of "Looking for Alaska" miniseries
Larry Fenix of Kemo For Emo recorded his own version of "I will Follow You Into The Dark" for a featured Youtube video on the bands channel
 glaive recorded a cover for his Spotify Singles EP released in July 2022.

References

External links
 Official music video
 Lyrics to songs from Plans

2006 singles
Death Cab for Cutie songs
Pop ballads
2005 songs
Songs written by Ben Gibbard
Atlantic Records singles
Songs about death
2000s ballads